Arpa FC ), is a defunct Armenian football club from Yeghegnadzor, Vayots Dzor Province.

The club was founded as Momik FC in 1992. However, it was dissolved in early 2003 due to financial difficulties and is inactive from professional football.

League record

References
RSSSF Armenia (and subpages per year)

Defunct football clubs in Armenia
2003 disestablishments in Armenia